Hulusi Kentmen (20 January 1912 – 20 December 1993) was a Turkish actor.

He was born in Tarnovo, Bulgaria, in 1912. He studied at petty officer preparatory school and graduated with 3rd class petty officer rank. After serving in the navy for a long time, he took up acting. He acted in the play Hisse-i Şaiya and made his film debut in 1940 with Sürtük. Between 1942 and 1988, he acted in over 500 films. In 1967, he went on an Anatolian tour with Hüseyin Baradan, Şahin Tek and later with Atıf Kaptan.

References

External links
 

1912 births
1993 deaths
Turkish male film actors
Turkish male stage actors
Turkish male television actors
Bulgarian Turks in Turkey
Bulgarian emigrants to Turkey
People from Veliko Tarnovo
20th-century Turkish male actors
Turkish non-commissioned personnel